The Sorbian alphabet is based on the ISO basic Latin alphabet but uses diacritics such as the acute accent and the caron, making it similar to the Czech and Polish alphabets. (This mixture is also found in the Belarusian Latin alphabet.) The standard character encoding for the Sorbian alphabet is ISO 8859-2 (Latin-2).

The alphabet is used for the Sorbian languages, although some letters are used in only one of the two languages (Upper Sorbian and Lower Sorbian).

Alphabet table

An earlier version of the Lower Sorbian alphabet included the use of the letters b́ (or b'), ṕ, ḿ, ẃ and rarely f́ (or f') to indicate palatalized labials. These have been replaced by bj, pj, mj, wj, and fj.

Sorbian orthography also includes two digraphs:

The digraph ch follows h in alphabetical order.

References

 Jana Šołćina, Edward Wornar: Obersorbisch im Selbststudium, Hornjoserbšćina za samostudij, Bautzen 2000, Seiten 12–15 
 Starosta: Dolnoserbsko-nimski słownik, Niedersorbisch-deutsches Wörterbuch, Bautzen 1999, Seiten 15–21 

Alphabet
Latin alphabets
West Slavic languages
Sorbian culture